KCOB (1280 AM) is a commercial radio station that serves the community of Newton, Iowa.  The station primarily broadcasts an oldies format, but also provides local and national news, weather and sports.  KCOB is owned by Alpha Media, through licensee Alpha Media Licensee LLC.

The station also broadcasts the St. Louis Cardinal baseball games, as well as the Newton High School football and basketball games.

External links
KCOB website

COB
Alpha Media radio stations